Loyalton is an unincorporated community in Washington Township, Dauphin County, Pennsylvania, United States, and is a part of the Harrisburg-Carlisle Metropolitan Statistical Area.

References

Harrisburg–Carlisle metropolitan statistical area
Unincorporated communities in Dauphin County, Pennsylvania
Unincorporated communities in Pennsylvania